James Derham (May 2, 17621802?) (also known as James Durham) was an American physician who was the first African American to formally practice medicine in the United States. Despite practicing medicine he never received an M.D. degree.

Biography 
James Derham was born into slavery in Philadelphia in 1762. As a child, Derham was transferred to Dr. John Kearsley Jr. under whom Derham studied medicine. From Dr. Kearsley, Derham learned about compound medicine with a focus on curing illnesses of the throat, as well as patient bedside manner. Upon Dr. Kearsley's death, Derham, then fifteen years old, was moved between several different masters before finally settling with Dr. George West, a surgeon for a British regiment during the American Revolutionary War. He was eventually transferred again, this time to New Orleans doctor Robert Dove. As an assistant at Dove's practice, Derham and Dove became friends, and Dove eventually granted Derham his freedom. With some financial assistance from Dove, Derham opened his own medical practice in New Orleans. By 1789, his practice is reported to have made about $3,000 annually. In 1788, Derham and Dr. Benjamin Rush met each other in Philadelphia, and corresponded with one another for twelve years. Derham's final letter to Rush in 1802 is the last record of his existence. It is believed that after the Spanish authorities restricted Derham to treating throat diseases in 1801, Derham left his practice in New Orleans.

Derham in literature 
W. E. B. Du Bois mentions Derham in his influential essay "The Talented Tenth":

"Then came Dr. James Derham, who could tell even the learned Dr. Rush something of medicine, and Lemuel Haynes, to whom Middlebury College gave an honorary A. M. in 1804. These and others we may call the Revolutionary group of distinguished Negroes - they were persons of marked ability, leaders of a Talented Tenth, standing conspicuously among the best of their time. They strove by word and deed to save the color line from becoming the line between the bond and free, but all they could do was nullified by Eli Whitney and the Curse of Gold. So they passed into forgetfulness."

See also
 Jane Minor
 List of African-American firsts
 List of people who disappeared
 Men in nursing

References

External links
 
 James Durnham, a pioneering physician and skilled healer at the African American Registry
 

1762 births
1800s missing person cases
18th-century American physicians
18th-century American scientists
18th-century American slaves
19th-century American physicians
African-American nurses
African-American scientists
American nurses
American pharmacists
Male nurses
Missing person cases in Pennsylvania
People of colonial Pennsylvania
Physicians from Philadelphia
Year of death unknown